Bill Newton (1919–1943) was an Australian recipient of the Victoria Cross.

Bill Newton may also refer to:
 Bill Newton (politician) (1934–2015), Australian politician
 Bill Newton (basketball) (born 1950), American basketball player
 Bill Newton (footballer) (1875–1941), Australian rules footballer

See also 
 William Newton (disambiguation)